The 2016 Jacksonville State Gamecocks football team represented Jacksonville State University as a member of the Ohio Valley Conference (OVC) during the 2016 NCAA Division I FCS football season. Led by third-year head coach John Grass, the Gamecocks compiled an overall record of 10–2 with a mark of 7–0 in conference play, winning the OVC title for the third consecutive season. Jacksonville State received the OVC's automatic bid to the NCAA Division I Football Championship playoffs. After a first-round bye, the Gamecocks lost in the second round to the eventual national runner-up, Youngstown State. The team played home games at Burgess–Snow Field at JSU Stadium in Jacksonville, Alabama. The team played home games at Burgess–Snow Field at JSU Stadium in Jacksonville, Alabama.

Schedule

Game summaries

North Alabama

@ LSU

Coastal Carolina

@ Liberty

Tennessee Tech

Austin Peay

@ Eastern Kentucky

Eastern Illinois

@ Southeast Missouri State

@ Murray State

UT Martin

Youngstown State—NCAA Division I Second Round

Ranking movements

References

Jacksonville State
Jacksonville State Gamecocks football seasons
Ohio Valley Conference football champion seasons
Jacksonville State
Jacksonville State Gamecocks football